Luis Alonso Mejía García (born 27 April 1946) is a Mexican politician from the National Action Party. From 2006 to 2009 he served as Deputy of the LX Legislature of the Mexican Congress representing Tamaulipas.

References

1946 births
Living people
Politicians from Tamaulipas
National Action Party (Mexico) politicians
21st-century Mexican politicians
Members of the Congress of Tamaulipas
Deputies of the LX Legislature of Mexico
Members of the Chamber of Deputies (Mexico) for Tamaulipas